Andrzej Sakson (born 1950 in Elbląg) is a Polish sociologist and historian.  Since 2004 he has been the director of the Western Institute (Instytut Zachodni) in Poznań.

Sakson is a professor of sociology at the Institute of Sociology of Adam Mickiewicz University (Instytut Socjologi UAM) in Poznań, and the Western Institute.  He specializes in research on national and ethnic minorities, with special focus on the German minority in Poland and the Polish ethnic groups of Mazurians and Warmians in the north-eastern Polish region of Warmia-Masuria.

Publications
Mazurzy – społeczność pogranicza, 1990.

References

1950 births
Living people
Polish sociologists
20th-century Polish historians
Polish male non-fiction writers
People from Elbląg
Academic staff of Adam Mickiewicz University in Poznań